The siege of Almeida took place in August 1762 when a Spanish force besieged and captured the city of Almeida from its Portuguese defenders during the Seven Years' War. The city was taken on 25 August as part of the invasion of Portugal by a Spanish army commanded by the Count of Aranda.

The force that captured Almeida was part of a major Franco-Spanish offensive to overrun Portugal. A northern pincer invaded Portugal from Galicia crossing the Douro and threatening Porto while the southern force crossed the border from Ciudad Rodrigo and proceeded towards the major Portuguese fortification of Almeida. It was captured after a nine-day siege, but a further Spanish advance was stalled by the arrival of 8,000 British troops - and their disruption of Spanish supplies at the Battle of Valencia de Alcántara.

Almeida was garrisoned by Aranda, but it remained the only major fortress in Spanish hands by the close of the war. It was returned to the Portuguese following the Treaty of Paris in exchange for the return of Havana and Manila to Spain by the British.

See also
 Great Britain in the Seven Years War
 Spanish invasion of Portugal (1762)

References

Bibliography
 Brown, Peter Douglas. William Pitt, Earl of Chatham: The Great Commoner. George Allen & Unwin, 1978.
 Dull, Jonathan R. The French Navy and the Seven Years' War. University of Nebraska, 2005.
 Jaques, Tony. Dictionary of Battles and Sieges. Greenwood Press, 2007.
 Petrie, Sir Charles. King Charles III of Spain. Constable, 1971.

Almeida (1762)
Almeida (1762)
Almeida
Almeida
1762 in Portugal